Cadillac Desert: Water and the Transformation of Nature is a 1997 American four-part documentary series about water, money, politics, and the transformation of nature.  The film was directed by Jon H. Else and Linda Harrar.

Synopsis
The film chronicles the growth of a large community in the western American desert.  It brought abundance and a legacy of risk created in the United States and abroad.

The first three episodes are based on Marc Reisner's book, Cadillac Desert (1986), that delves into the history of water use and misuse in the American West.  It explores the triumph and disaster, heroism and intrigue, and the rivalries and bedfellows that dominate this little-known chapter of American history.

The final episode is drawn from Sandra Postel's book, Last Oasis (1992), which examines the global impact of the technologies and policies that came out of the United States' manipulation of water. She demonstrates how they have created the need for conservation methods that will protect Earth's water for the next century.

The parts of the documentary are entitled:
 "Mulholland's Dream" (90 minutes)
 "An American Nile" (60 minutes)
 "The Mercy of Nature" (60 minutes)
 "Last Oasis" (60 minutes)

Interviews
 David Brower
 Floyd Dominy
 Barry Goldwater
 Robert Towne

See also
 Cadillac Desert by Marc Reisner.

References

External links
 
 
 Cadillac Desert informational page at Professor Martin Stute's web site at Columbia University

1997 films
1997 documentary films
American documentary films
American independent films
Documentary films about water and the environment
1997 independent films
1990s English-language films
1990s American films